Alexandra Rodríguez Long (born January 30, 1997) is a Spanish former competitive pair skater. With partner Aritz Maestu, she is the 2010-11 Junior Spanish champion. They are the first pair team to represent Spain in ISU competition.

Career

Early career

Born in Las Palmas de Gran Canaria, Alexandra Rodríguez started skating in 2002.

Rodríguez decided she wanted to try figure skating with her identical twin sister Victoria, after watching the 2002 Winter Olympics. At the time, she was living in Germany and started skating in Duisburg in December 2003, when she was nearly 7 years old. Next season (2004–05) she joined the Essener Jugend-Eiskunstlauf Club beginning her competitive career.

2007–08
After three years the family moved back to Spain for her to train with Mikel Garcia in the Club Hielo Jaca. A year later due to problems with the rink, some members of the club continued training during weekends in  Anglet, France. That year she came 4th in the category of Debs/Juvenile in the Spanish Nationals in Barcelona.

2008–09
Next season a new rink opened in  Jaca, Spain but her trainer, Mikel Garcia, moved to the US. It was around this time that the European Figure Skating School was being launched in  Oberstdorf, Germany under the direction of Mr. and Mrs. Huth. She moved to Oberstdorf to join, together with her sister Victoria, the first year of EFSS and trained mainly with Alexander König. That year she came 4th again, in Infantil/Intermediate category in the Spanish Nationals.

It was during a novice pair seminar in Oberstdorf, and in particular, watching a pair performing warm up lifts, that she and her sister decided that what they really wanted to do was Pair skating.

2009–10
A season later, when her Spanish club, Club Hielo Jaca, hired the new trainer, Igor Sinyutin, from Samara, Russia, the family moved back to Jaca. That year she started competing in Novice and came 11th in the 2010 Spanish Nationals.

That same season, two single skaters from the San Sebastian ice skating club, Txuri Berri, were approached with the intention of skating as Pair Skaters with the Rodríguez Long sisters. Both Aritz Maestu and Felipe Montoya accepted and at the end of March, the two pairs went back to Oberstdorf for a week's seminar with  Alexander König. A few weeks later, at the beginning of April 2010, they also attended the yearly ISU Pair Seminar in Berlin, Germany.

Later that year, in June, they attended a seminar with Oleg Vasiliev in Barcelona.

2010–11
In August 2010 Aritz moved to Jaca to train pairs full-time with Rodríguez with their new coaches, Miguel Alegre and his wife Emmaly Baxter. That year they attended some regional competitions in Spain. In December 2010 they went to Spanish Nationals and came 1st in Junior competing alone. For the first time Spain had all four disciplines in the Spanish Nationals. Rodríguez also competed in novice ladies' singles and finished 9th.

In May 2011 they attended their second ISU Pair Seminar in Berlin, Germany.

In the summer they were sent to  Quebec, Canada to train with Richard Gauthier and Bruno Marcotte for three weeks.

2011–12
This season they attended two ISU Junior Grand Prix. The first one in  Innsbruck, Austria where they came 17th with 90.97. That was the first time they ever competed with their new long program, music from Phantom of the Opera, choreographed by Emma Baxter. Their second junior grand prix was in Tallinn, Estonia where they achieved a new SB of 91.30 and came 11th. Their free program also earned a new SB. In June, Rodríguez had a serious fall with a knock to the head during practice and had to retire for a few months for rehabilitation. During that time it was decided for Maestu to find another partner.

Programs 
(with Maestu)

Competitive highlights 
(with Maestu)

References

External links 

 
  in YouTube
  in Facebook

1997 births
Living people
Spanish female pair skaters
Spanish female single skaters
Sportspeople from Las Palmas